Samir Dahmani (born 3 April 1991 in Martigues) is a French middle-distance runner. He represented his country in the 800 metres at the 2017 World Championships without qualifying for the semifinals.

International competitions

Personal bests

Outdoor
800 metres – 1:44.07 (Paris 2016)
1000 metres – 2:21.00 (Montreuil-sous-Bois 2015)
1500 metres – 3:37.05 (Paris 2015)
3000 metres – 8:20.36 (Montreuil-sous-Bois 2009)

Indoor
800 metres – 1:49.13 (Paris 2010)
1000 metres – 2:26.24 (Aubiére 2008)
1500 metres – 3:41.14 (Sabadell 2016)
One mile – 4:30.30 (Nampa 2011)
2000 metres – 5:11.97 (Ghent 2016)
3000 metres – 7:54.47 (Metz 2017)

References

1991 births
Living people
French male middle-distance runners
World Athletics Championships athletes for France
People from Martigues
Sportspeople from Bouches-du-Rhône